Unitel (Universal or United telecommunications) is a Mongolian Corporate Group of information technology companies, headquartered at Central Tower in downtown Ulan Bator, Mongolia. It was founded on December 23, 2005 as BSB consortium as GSM mobile phone operator and began operations on June 26, 2006.
As a provider of mobile telephone services, Unitel is the second largest company in terms of subscriber base and 14th largest company in Mongolia as measured by a composite of revenues, profits, assets and taxes. Its revenue, profits and revenue per subscriber figures are rapidly growing. Unitel also provides broadband subscription television services through Univision.

Within its initial launch year, Unitel acquired 200 thousand subscribers, the biggest acquisition in one year in Mongolian telecommunication history. In 2009, Unitel launched its 3G network on HSDPA 2100 MHz. Unitel network covers approximately 88% of total population of Mongolia.

In November 2010, Unitel declared that it has become 100% indigenous company (i.e. Mongolian share owners bought all share from the Korean side). In 2011, Unitel renewed its logo. Logo (Fibonacci spiral) represents growth and harmony. Major shareholder of the company is MCS Holding, Mongolian largest privately held organization.

Members of the group 
 UNITEL, mobile network operator
 MCS Com, broadband ISP
 MONSAT, satellite communication service provider
 SKYNETWORKS, Mongolia's biggest fiber-optic network
 Shangri-La Group, new era of fixed phone
 UNIVISION, triple-play operator IPTV, internet, fixed phone

History
 2001. MCSCom was established and provided broadband internet service.
 2003. Monsat introduced satellite communication service for the first time in Mongolia.
 2004. Skynetworks started construction of its UB’s widest fiber-optic network.
 2005. BSB Telecom consortium (Unitel) won an open tender to select the third operator with mandate to ensure fair competition in mobile industry.
 2006. Unitel launched its cellular phone service with GSM technology.
 2007. Skynetcom introduced Mongolia’s first fixed IP phone service.
 2008. Unitel built own nationwide reliable network.
 2009. Unitel extended its worldwide international roaming coverage.
 2010. Unitel became a 100 percent Mongolia company.
 2011. Univision launched first triple-play service (IPTV, IPPhone, IPNet) of Mongolia.
 2011. Unitel, MCSCom, Monsat, Skynetworks, Skynetcom and Univision united to establish UNITEL GROUP.
 2014. Unitel, Mongolian №1 ICT Group

Services

Mobile services 

 TourSim
 International calling | IDD, Roaming
 Postpaid services
 Prepaid services
 BlackBerry
 IP phone service
 Content services
 3.5G services
 Value added services
 4G LTE

Infrastructure 

 Fiber optic (Fiber Core)
 High speed Ethernet Bandwidth
 FTTx Ethernet
 Designated (Exclusive) Network
 High security VPN
 IX (Internet Exchange)
 Wireless network
 3.5G network
 LTE

Corporate ICT solution 

 Network establishment (satellite, fiber optic, radio)
 Internet
 Ethernet and VPN
 Mobile, satellite and fixed phone
 M2M
 LBS
 Mobile Marketing

Satellite communication services 

 Voice service
 Data communication service
 Fax services from Iridium, BGAN, Inmarsat, Globalstar, Thuraya.

Triple play 

 IPTV
 Internet
 IP Phone

Cloud computing 

In 2011 Unitel launched the GreenBerry mobile mail service, which is Mongolia's first clouding service under an exclusive agreement with SEVEN Networks, US company.

LookTV 

In 2016, Unitel launched its video streaming service, LookTV, where its subscribers can access video-on-demand contents much like Netflix. Monthly subscription fee is different depending on the packages, Asian Pack, Hollywood Pack, Mongolian Pack and ALL Pack which includes all the contents previous packs offer.

U brand 

TBA

Distribution
 Network coverage in 464 regions
 42 service centers, about 10000 sales points and mobile dealers

References

External links
Official Site 

Telecommunications companies of Mongolia
Companies based in Ulaanbaatar